AG2R La Mondiale is a French multinational insurance firm  headquartered in Paris that engages in global insurance, financial services, supplementary retirement fund and supplementary pension.

With €29 billion in contributions in (2017), AG2R La Mondiale is the biggest provider of supplementary pensions in France, managing one quarter of employees in the private sector, and the second biggest health insurer (excluding banking groups). The firm has 15 million individual customers and more than 500,000 business customers.

AG2R La Mondiale owns the AG2R La Mondiale cycling team and sponsors the Transat AG2R sailing race.

History
The company is a fusion of two entities. Those are the AG2R Group, a French-based interprofessional insurance and supplementary retirement fund group, created in 1951 and headquartered in Paris, and the La Mondiale Group, which is a French-based international group for supplementary pension and estate planning insurance, created in 1905 and headquartered in Lille.

References

External links
 
 

Financial services companies established in 1951
Insurance companies of France
Companies based in Paris
French brands
Multinational companies headquartered in France
French companies established in 1951